Voskresenskoye is a rural locality (a selo) in Razdolyevskoye Rural Settlement, Kolchuginsky District, Vladimir Oblast, Russia. The population was 10 as of 2010. There are 2 streets.

Geography 
Voskresenskoye is located on the Sheredar River, 35 km southwest of Kolchugino (the district's administrative centre) by road. Ignatovo is the nearest rural locality.

References 

Rural localities in Kolchuginsky District